Deena Nath Singh Yadav is an Indian politician. As of 2014 he served as the Uttar Pradesh state secretary of the All India Kisan Sabha. As of 2001 he was a member of the Central Kisan Committee (the national leadership of the All India Kisan Sabha).

He won the Gangapur seat in the 1991 Uttar Pradesh Legislative Assembly election. He stood as a Communist Party of India (Marxist) candidate, obtaining 41,899 votes (43.07% of the votes in the constituency).

Singh contested the Varanasi Lok Sabha seat in the 1998 Indian general election. He finished in second place with 125,286 votes (19.42%).

Singh contested the Bhatparrani seat in the 2007 Uttar Pradesh Legislative Assembly election. He obtained 2,028 votes.

References

Communist Party of India (Marxist) politicians from Uttar Pradesh
Uttar Pradesh MLAs 1991–1993
Living people
Year of birth missing (living people)